Ploettnera is a genus of fungi in the family Dermateaceae. The genus contains 5 species.

See also
 List of Dermateaceae genera

References

External links
Ploettnera at Index Fungorum

Dermateaceae genera